The Scoop of the Year award is one of the honours given annually by the British Press Awards.

References

External links
 British Press Awards - roll call

Scoops of the Year
Press Awards Scoops of the Year
Journalism lists